Igor Stefanović (born 17 July 1987) is a Serbian professional footballer who plays as a goalkeeper for Portuguese club Leixões.

Club career
Born in Svrljig, Stefanović came through the youth ranks of Radnički Niš, making his first senior appearances in 2004. He was transferred to Zemun in the 2007 winter transfer window. After debuting in the top flight of Serbian football, Stefanović switched to Voždovac in the summer of 2007. He recorded just one appearance for the club, before moving to Borac Čačak in the 2008 winter transfer window. Over the following 18 months, Stefanović failed to make any appearances for the club, being completely overshadowed by more experienced Saša Radivojević and Branko Grahovac. He subsequently joined Banat Zrenjanin, collecting nine appearances in the 2009–10 Serbian First League.

In July 2011, Stefanović moved to Portugal and joined Santa Clara. He was the team's first-choice goalkeeper in the 2011–12 season, playing the full 90 minutes in all 30 games. In June 2012, Stefanović signed a three-year contract with Porto. He was immediately assigned to their reserve team, playing regularly in the 2012–13 season.

In the summer of 2015, Stefanović signed with Primeira Liga side Moreirense. He made 31 league appearances in his debut season, helping them to avoid relegation. In July 2017, Stefanović was transferred to Spanish club Córdoba.

In late 2018, Stefanović returned to Portugal and rejoined his former club Arouca.

International career
In 2006, Stefanović appeared as a substitute in two friendlies for Serbia U21 (against the Czech Republic and Portugal). He was later named by Miroslav Đukić in the 23-man squad for the 2007 UEFA European Under-21 Championship, but was forced to miss the tournament due to an injury. Later on, Stefanović earned two more caps for the under-21 side, playing the full 90 minutes in both of Serbia's games at the Valeriy Lobanovskyi Memorial Tournament in August 2007.

Honours
Moreirense
 Taça da Liga: 2016–17

Notes

References

External links
 
 
 

Association football goalkeepers
C.D. Santa Clara players
Córdoba CF players
Expatriate footballers in Portugal
Expatriate footballers in Spain
Expatriate footballers in North Macedonia
F.C. Arouca players
FC Porto B players
FK Banat Zrenjanin players
FK Borac Čačak players
FK Rabotnički players
FK Radnički Niš players
FK Voždovac players
FK Zemun players
G.D. Chaves players
Leixões S.C. players
Liga Portugal 2 players
Macedonian First Football League players
Moreirense F.C. players
People from Svrljig
Primeira Liga players
Segunda División players
Serbia and Montenegro footballers
Serbia under-21 international footballers
Serbian expatriate footballers
Serbian expatriate sportspeople in Portugal
Serbian expatriate sportspeople in Spain
Serbian expatriate sportspeople in North Macedonia
Serbian First League players
Serbian footballers
Serbian SuperLiga players
1987 births
Living people